Lesbian, gay, bisexual, and transgender (LGBT) people in Federal District, Brazil enjoy many of the same legal protections available to non-LGBT people. Homosexuality is legal in the state.

Same-sex unions
On 1 December 2012, the Court of Public Registers of the Brazilian Federal District (DF), ruled that, effective immediately, same-sex marriage licenses should be granted without a judge's intervention.

Legal recognition and funding for sex change operations
Changing one's name and sex is legal in the Federal District.

References

Federal District (Brazil)
Federal District (Brazil)